Nancy Abraham Sumari is a Tanzanian author, business woman and social entrepreneur. She is the Managing Director of Bongo5 Media Group (T) Ltd,The Executive Director of The Neghesti Sumari Foundation and The Jenga Hub, as well as a published author of the children's book series, Nyota Yako. In 2017 Africa Youth Awards named her among the 100 Most Influential Young Africans.

Early life and education
Sumari was born in Arusha. She had her primary and secondary education in Kenya, and later graduated with a bachelor of business administration from University of Dar Es Salaam and a Future leaders of business and Industry from Lehigh University, PA.

Miss Tanzania and Miss World 2005

Nancy was selected as Miss Tanzania 2005 and later competed at Miss World 2005 where she placed in the top 6, and won the title Continental Queen of Africa for 2005.
This is the first time and highest replacement for Tanzania at Miss World pageant 2005 .|

Career  
Nancy is the founder and executive director of the Neghesti Sumari Foundation whose programs and initiatives leverage the use of literature, technology and agriculture to create value. She has engaged in projects of society from women empowerment to mentoring youth and championing for quality education.

Nancy is a published author of three books, two children's books and one in honour of Samia Suluhu. Her first, 'Nyota Yako' (Your Star) is a book that is set in the form of poem and sings the songs of the great women in the Tanzanian society who are successful in the roles they play. It is meant to inspire the African girl child to in pursuit of their dreams.

Sumari's second book, titled HAKI, is a book set on the backbone of the Law Of The Child Act of 2009, that encourages children to know the rights that protect them.

Among her foundations initiatives have been transforming learning outcomes among youth and children through digital literacy programs and applying design thinking methodologies to create value; for which she won the 'Tigo Digital Change Maker' award for in Tanzania

Nancy is a member of the World Economic Forum's Global Shapers Community, a Global Village Fellow, Mandela Washington Fellow 2017, and an Obama Leaders Africa 2019 fellow.

Books
Haki

Personal life
She is married to Luca Neghesti and they have one daughter called Zuri.

Awards and nominations

References 

https://www.hashtagsquare.com/nancy-sumari-biography/#AfLibWk 3.0

Living people
Miss World 2005 delegates
Tanzanian female models
Tanzanian beauty pageant winners
1986 births